Groß Glienicker See is a lake in the states of Brandenburg and Berlin, Germany. At an elevation of 31.6 m, its surface area is 0.66 km². The border between the city of Potsdam and the city of Berlin runs in a north–south direction through the center of the lake, with the Potsdam locality of Groß Glienicke on the left shore and the Berlin locality of Kladow on the right shore.

Geology
Together with the Sacrower See to the south and the Heiliger See in Potsdam, Glienicker See forms a chain of glacial lakes. It lacks a surface outlet and is almost entirely fed by groundwater.

The lake during the Cold War

The border between West Berlin and East Germany in the center of the lake was marked by buoys. The Berlin Wall on the west and south shores prevented access to or even a sight of the shore by East Germans. For those in West Berlin the lake was a popular place for swimming. One could swim (or in the winter walk over the ice) up to the buoys.

Alexander Haus
Alexander house stands on the north-western side of the lake. The home was constructed in 1927 by Dr. Alfred Alexander on land leased from Otto von Wollank, with the intention of building a weekend house. The home was photographed by Lotte Jacobi the following year. On the advent of World War II the family fled Nazi Germany in 1936 to England. From 1937-1952, the home was occupied by composter Will Meisel and actress Eliza Illiard. The first member of the Alexander family to return to the home was Dr. Afred's son, Hanns Alexander in 1946. Hanns was notable was capturing Rudolf Höss. From 1952-2003, the Kühne and Fuhrmann families resided in the home. The house then fell into disrepair from 2003 onwards, until 2013 when writer Thomas Harding discovered the home, due to his family links to the Alexander family. The home was restored and given monument status in 2014. Thomas wrote The House by the Lake detailing the history of the home.

References

External links 
 

Lakes of Berlin
Lakes of Brandenburg
Geography of Potsdam
Spandau